Vincebus Eruptum (pseudo-Latin) is the debut album of American rock band Blue Cheer. Released on January 16, 1968, the album features a heavy-thunderous blues sound, which would later be known as heavy metal.

A commercial and critical success, Vincebus Eruptum peaked at number 11 on the Billboard 200 albums chart and spawned the number 14 hit cover of Eddie Cochran's "Summertime Blues". Being an example of hard rock, it is also lauded as one of the first heavy metal albums. Spin magazine placed it at number 22 on their list of the 40 greatest metal albums.

Background and history
Blue Cheer's debut album was recorded in 1967 at Amigo Studios in North Hollywood, California. In an interview, frontman Dickie Peterson explained that "Some songs I wrote have taken 20 years to really complete. And there are other songs like 'Doctor Please' or 'Out of Focus' that I wrote in ten minutes."

On "Doctor Please" in particular, Peterson explained that "when I wrote the song (in 1967), it was a glorification of drugs. I was going through a lot of 'Should I take this drug or should I not take this drug? Blah, blah, blah.' There was a lot of soul searching at the time when I wrote that song, and I actually decided to take it. That’s what that song was about and that’s what I sang it about, sort of a drug anthem for me." On the band's cover of Eddie Cochran's "Summertime Blues", Peterson noted that "We kept changing it around and adding/taking bits away. It also has to do with large doses of LSD."

Reception and legacy

Blue Cheer's debut album has widely been held in high regard by critics. Writing for music website AllMusic, Mark Deming described Vincebus Eruptum as "a glorious celebration of rock & roll primitivism run through enough Marshall amps to deafen an army", praising the band's "sound and fury" as one of the founding movements of heavy metal. Pitchfork reviewer Alexander Linhardt gave the album nine out of a maximum ten points, noting that the album was less structured than its successor, Outsideinside. It has also been described by Billboard as "the epitome of psychedelic rock", while VH1 called it an "acid rock masterwork". Martin Popoff was less enthusiastic in his review and called the music "derivative" and "equating closer to acid-washed loud and slurring renditions of '60s rock" than heavy metal, judging the album "a howling mess."

Online music service Rhapsody included Vincebus Eruptum in its list of the "10 Essential Proto-Metal Albums", suggesting that the band "not only inspired the term 'power trio,' they practically invented heavy metal." In 1998, The Wire included Vincebus Eruptum in their list of "100 Records That Set the World on Fire (While No One Was Listening)", calling it a "seminal" album that "snarled rabidly in the face of hippy innocence and soon became a Hells Angels party stomper." They also note the strong influence the album had on 1990s Japanese noise trios such as High Rise and Musica Transonic.

Track listing

Personnel
Blue Cheer
Dickie Peterson – vocals, bass
Leigh Stephens – guitar
Paul Whaley – drums

Additional personnel
Abe "Voco" Kesh – production
John MacQuarrie – engineering
John Van Hamersveld – photography

Remastered version
Bill Levenson – production
Ellen Fitton – remastering

References

1968 debut albums
Philips Records albums
Blue Cheer albums